Patrick Skene, known professionally as Pip Skid and Wicked Nut, is a Canadian rapper and writer, and one of the most active creative artists at the Vancouver & Winnipeg-based independent hip hop label Peanuts & Corn.  Skid is known for his distinctive gravel-throated vocals.

Career
In the early 1990s Skid was a co-founder of Canadian hip hop group Farm Fresh, and recorded an EP and three albums with that group. He was also a member of other crews such as Fermented Reptile, Hip Hop Weiners, Taking Care of Business, and Break Bread.

In 2001 Skid took part in the Close To The Coast Festival in Charlottetown, Prince Edward Island.

In 2004  Skid's album Funny Farm was released; it hit #32 on the combined charts. His single "Alone Again" from this album Funny Farm was played in rotation on the Much Music network.

In 2005 Skid and fellow rapper mcenroe released an album, Funny Farm 2 which hit #3 on the hip hop charts. Skid's 2010 album Skid Row peaked at #4 on the Canadian Hip Hop charts on May 1, 2010.

Selected discography
Farm Fresh - Space EP (CD, Peanuts & Corn)
Farm Fresh - Crazy Fiction (CD, Peanuts & Corn)
Farm Fresh - Played Out (CD,
Farm Fresh - Time is Running Out (CD, Peanuts & Corn)
Pip Skid - Friends4Ever (CD, Peanuts & Corn)
Pip Skid - Money Matters (7", Peanuts & Corn)
Pip Skid - I'm Mean (CD, Peanuts & Corn)
Pip Skid - Funny Farm (CD, Peanuts & Corn)
Pip Skid - Funny Farm 2 (12", Peanuts & Corn)
Pip Skid - The Pip Donahue Show (2007) (EP, Independent)
Taking Care of Business - Taking Care of Business (CD, First Things First)
Fermented Reptile - Let's Just Call You "Quits" (CD, Peanuts & Corn)
Hip Hop Weiners - All Beef, No Chicken (CD, Peanuts & Corn)
Pip Skid - Skid Row (CD, Foultone)

Appears on
Best of Winnipeg Vol. 1 - The Emcees (DVD, Quality Hip-Hop)
Culturama Video Collection Vol. 4 (DVD, Culturama)
DJ Neoteric - Indie-cent Exposure Part 3 (CD, Futility Records)
Epic - Local Only (CD, Clothes Horse Records)
Epic - 8:30 in Newfoundland (CD, Clothes Horse Records)
Fishin' In Troubled Waters - Fishin' In Troubled Waters (CD, Hip Hop Infinity Recordings)
Mcenroe - 5 Years in the Factory (CD, Vertical Form)
Mood Ruff - Maxim (CD, Slo Coach Recordings)
Parklike Setting - School Day 2 Garbage Day 4 (CD, Peanuts & Corn)
Peanuts & Corn - Summer 2002 (12", Peanuts & Corn)
Peanuts & Corn - Factory Seconds (CD, Peanuts & Corn)
Recyclone - Corroding the Dead World (CD, Clothes Horse Records)
Rheostatics - Nitelines Recording Sessions (CD, Drog Canadian Recordings)
Scribble Jam - Tour Documentary (DVD + CD, Scribble Magazine Productions)
Sixtoo - Songs I Hate (And Other People Moments) (CD, Anticon)
Sound Barriers - Sound Barriers (CD, Sound Barrier Recordings)
The Goods - 4 Four (CD, Camobear)
Various Artists - Bare Skin Compilation (CD, HipHopHotSpot.com)
Various Artists - States of Abuse (CD, Entartete Kunst)

References

Canadian male rappers
Living people
20th-century Canadian rappers
21st-century Canadian rappers
Year of birth missing (living people)
20th-century Canadian male musicians
21st-century Canadian male musicians